Andreas Beck won in the singles' final of the first edition of these championships. He defeated qualifier Filip Prpic 7–5, 6–3.

Seeds

Draw

Final four

Top half

Bottom half

External links
 Main Draw
 Qualifying Draw

Singles
SAT Khorat Open - Singles
 in Thai tennis